Lupercus of Berytus was a Greek grammarian of the 3rd century. He wrote On the Word, The Foundation of Arsinoe in Egypt, and other works.

References 
stoa.org

3rd-century Greek people
3rd-century Romans
3rd-century writers
Ancient Greek grammarians